Coaldale may refer to:

Canada
Coaldale, Alberta
Coaldale (Rednek Air) Aerodrome

United States
Coaldale, Colorado
Coaldale, Nevada
Coaldale, Bedford County, Pennsylvania
Coaldale, Schuylkill County, Pennsylvania
Coaldale, West Virginia